Terebratula is a modern genus of brachiopods with a fossil record dating back to the Late Devonian. These brachiopods are stationary epifaunal suspension feeders and have a worldwide distribution.

Description 
Terebratula species have biconvex egg-shaped shells, anterior margins of the valves have two small folds, concentric growth lines are quite thin or nearly absent. The larger valve has a ventral umbo with the opening through which they extend a short peduncle.

Selected species

Reassigned species 
As Terebratula has been erected early on in paleontology, many species have since been reassigned to other genera.

Gallery

References

External links
Terebratula in the Paleobiology Database
Short notes on Terebratula
J. Morris On the Subdivision of the Genus Terebratula

Terebratulida
Prehistoric brachiopod genera
Devonian brachiopods
Carboniferous brachiopods
Permian brachiopods
Mesozoic brachiopods
Cenozoic brachiopods
Prehistoric animals of Africa
Extinct animals of Antarctica
Prehistoric animals of Asia
Prehistoric invertebrates of Oceania
Prehistoric animals of Europe
Prehistoric brachiopods of North America
Mesozoic animals of South America
Cretaceous Colombia
Fossils of Colombia
Extant Late Devonian first appearances